The surname Dorfmeister means "village mayor" and may refer to:

 Gregor Dorfmeister (born 1929), German author
 Johann Georg Dorfmeister (1736-1786), Austrian sculptor
 Karl Dorfmeister (1876-1955), Austrian architect
 Michaela Dorfmeister (born 1973), Austrian ski racer
 Stephan Dorfmeister (1729-1797), Austrian painter
 Richard Dorfmeister (born 1968), Austrian musician, part of Kruder & Dorfmeister